

Events
 Clara Gregory Baer introduces  (as it was written at the time) to Sophie Newcomb College (now part of Tulane University)
 February 7 – Vanderbilt University plays against the local YMCA in Nashville, Tennessee – the first recorded instance of a college basketball team facing an outside opponent.
 April 8 – In the second recorded instance of an organized college basketball game, Geneva College faces the New Brighton YMCA in Beaver Falls, Pennsylvania.

Births
Birch Bayh (basketball coach), coach
Benjamin Van Alstyne, coach
William Reid (basketball), coach
Clarence Applegran, coach
Wilmer D. Elfrink, coach and player
Norman C. Paine, coach

References